Funny Man is a British comedy television series which first aired on ITV in 1981. It portrays a family of music hall entertainers in the late 1920s and early 1930s, at the time of the Great Depression and the continuing desertion of traditional music hall audiences to the cinemas. Star Jimmy Jewel had himself grown up in a family of comedians active during the era.

Actors who appeared in individual episodes include Elsie Randolph, Nell Campbell, Sylvia Coleridge, Madeline Smith and Leslie Sarony

Cast
 Jimmy Jewel as Alec Gibson (13 episodes)
 David Schofield as  Davey Gibson (13 episodes)
 Andrew Fell as Teddy Gibson (13 episodes)
 Jean Boht as Elsie (13 episodes)
 Sharon Duce as Kath Gibson (11 episodes)
 Lynda Bellingham as Gwen (11 episodes)
 Trudie Styler as Babs (11 episodes)
 Lesley Hand as  Wendy (11 episodes)
 Veronica Doran as  Freda (11 episodes)
 Tricia Ford as  Dolly (10 episodes) 
 Marianne Price as Rose (9 episodes)
 Pamela Stephenson as  Iris Reade (9 episodes)
 Barrie Ingham as Bobby Stobart (7 episodes)
 Jonathan Adams as Brendan Sykes (6 episodes)
 Bob Todd as  Billy Strothers (6 episodes)
 Joanna Van Gyseghem as Peggy Stobart (6 episodes)
 Pearl Hackney as Gloria Leslie (5 episodes)
 Arthur English as  George Leslie (5 episodes)
 Billy Milton as Ozzie (5 episodes)
 John Blythe as Cecil Foster (4 episodes)
 Alfred Marks as Ainsley King (4 episodes)
 Gareth Forwood as Max (3 episodes)

References

Bibliography
 Leslie Halliwell. Double Take and Fade Away. Grafton, 1987.

External links
 

ITV sitcoms
1981 British television series debuts
1981 British television series endings
1980s British comedy television series
English-language television shows